Francis Henry Lee  (born 29 April 1944) is an English former professional footballer who played as a forward.

Lee played for Bolton Wanderers, Manchester City, Derby County and England. A fast forward, he won League Championship medals with Manchester City and Derby, and scored more than 200 goals in his career. In 2010, he was inducted into the English Football Hall of Fame.

He holds the English record for the greatest number of penalties scored in a season, a feat that earned him the nickname Lee 1 (Pen) because that was the way his name always seemed to appear on the list of goal scores for City in the match results listings in the Sunday papers. This led to accusations of diving. One such accusation, from Leeds United's Norman Hunter, led to an on-pitch fight.

After retiring from football, Lee ran a successful toilet roll business, F.H. Lee Ltd, which made him a millionaire. In 1994, he became the major shareholder and chairman of Manchester City, but stepped down four years later.

Playing career
Lee started his professional career with Bolton Wanderers. Manchester City manager Joe Mercer signed him for a club record transfer fee of £60,000 in 1967. He made his Manchester City debut in a 2–0 win over Wolverhampton Wanderers at Maine Road, and scored his first Manchester City goal the following week at Fulham. In his first season at the club, he scored 16 League goals in 31 appearances, playing a crucial role in City's push for the 1967–68 League Championship; Mercer described him as "the final piece of the jigsaw". The title was decided on the final day of the season, City requiring a win at Newcastle United. City won the match 4–3, Lee scoring one of the goals, and were crowned champions. The following season Lee was part of the Manchester City team that won the 1969 FA Cup.

In the 1969–70 season, Lee was Manchester City's top scorer, an achievement he would subsequently match in each of the next four seasons. His tally that season included one of the most important goals of his career, a penalty in the final of the European Cup Winners' Cup.

Lee represented England at the 1970 World Cup in Mexico and was the first English player ever to receive a card in a World Cup.

In the 1971–72 season, Lee set a British record for the number of penalties scored in a season, with 15 of his 35 goals scored from the penalty spot. Many of the penalties resulted from fouls on Lee, earning him the nickname Lee One Pen. Some journalists, holding the opinion that Lee gained a number of penalties by diving, used the name Lee Won Pen instead. Lee's name is often cited in debates about diving in football; referees' chief Keith Hackett described him as a player who "had a reputation of falling down easily".

Lee left Manchester City in 1974, joining Derby County. For the second time in his career, Lee joined a team viewed as contenders for that season's league title. He was upset at Manchester City's decision to sell him and marked his first match against his former club by scoring the winning goal for Derby. Lee scored twelve league goals that season, Derby winning their second League title and Lee the second championship medal of his career. On 1 November 1975, Lee had a confrontation with Leeds United defender Norman Hunter, which gained a level of infamy after it was screened on Match of the Day. In the first half of the game, the referee adjudged that Hunter had fouled Lee in the Leeds penalty area, and awarded Derby a penalty. Charlie George, and not Lee, took the penalty kick, and scored. In the second half, Lee and Hunter were seen to be exchanging punches in an off-the-ball incident. The referee stopped the game and took both players' names, but it was not immediately clear if he had sent off either or both of them. However, as the two men walked away they began fighting again. After intervention by both sets of players, Hunter left the pitch and Lee was restrained and ushered off the field by a club official. In 2003, the incident was named by The Observer as sport's most spectacular dismissal.

Lee also held the record for the most goals in Manchester derbies, scoring 10 goals in all against Manchester United, a tally that equalled Joe Hayes' record. This record was later beaten by Wayne Rooney who scored his 11th goal in a Manchester derby on 22 September 2013.

Business career
After his playing career, Lee moved into business. His toilet roll manufacturing business once employed Peter Kay, later a famous comedian, who mentions his time there in his autobiography "The Sound of Laughter".

In 1994, Lee became chairman of Manchester City, ousting Peter Swales from the position by purchasing £3 million of shares at a price of £13.35 per share. Lee was welcomed as a hero by City's supporters, who had formed a movement named Forward With Franny backing his attempt to gain control of the club. Upon becoming chairman, Lee made a series of extravagant claims about his plans for the club, announcing that "This will be the happiest club in the land. The players will be the best paid and we'll drink plenty of champagne, celebrate and sing until we're hoarse". In 1995, he appointed his friend Alan Ball as manager, but the appointment proved unsuccessful and the club were relegated. Lee stepped down in 1998, with the club on the brink of relegation to the third tier of English football, a fate that Lee had dismissed at the previous annual general meeting by saying that he would "jump off the Kippax" if the club were relegated. He was succeeded by David Bernstein. Lee retained a shareholding after leaving the board of directors but later sold all his shares to Thaksin Shinawatra.

In addition to his business ventures, Lee also had a career as a racehorse trainer. Notable horses trained by Lee include Sir Harry Hardman, Allwight Then and Young Jason. Lee gave the trade up in 2001 to pursue his business commitments.

Personal life
Before becoming a professional footballer Lee showed promise at cricket, representing the Horwich and Westhoughton Schools FA Team in 1958. When his football career came to an end at Blackpool FC, he briefly returned to cricket, playing for Westhoughton's first XI in 1977 as a medium-fast bowler and middle to lower order batsman.

Lee was appointed Commander of the Order of the British Empire (CBE) in the 2016 New Year Honours for services to football and charity.

He was the subject of This Is Your Life in 1994 when he was surprised by Michael Aspel at Granada Studios in Manchester.

Honours

Manchester City
 Football League First Division: 1967–68
 FA Cup: 1968–69
 League Cup: 1969–70
 FA Charity Shield: 1968, 1972
 UEFA Cup Winners' Cup: 1969–70

Derby County
 Football League First Division: 1974–75
 FA Charity Shield: 1975

Individual
Football League First Division Golden boot: 1971–72
Manchester City Player of the Year: 1970
English Football Hall of Fame
1969 Ballon d'Or: 13rd
Most Penalty Scored in First Division: 1972
Manchester City Top Goalscorer: 1969, 1970(shared), 1971(shared), 1972, 1974

Order of the British Empire

References

External links

1944 births
People from Westhoughton
Living people
English footballers
Bolton Wanderers F.C. players
Derby County F.C. players
Manchester City F.C. players
England international footballers
1970 FIFA World Cup players
English football chairmen and investors
English Football League players
First Division/Premier League top scorers
Manchester City F.C. directors and chairmen
English Football Hall of Fame inductees
English Football League representative players
Commanders of the Order of the British Empire
Association football forwards
FA Cup Final players